Electrical safety is a system of organizational measures and technical means to prevent harmful and dangerous effects on workers from electric current, arcing, electromagnetic fields and static electricity.

History 
The electrical safety develops with the technical progress. In 1989  OSHA promulgated a much-needed regulation in the General Industry Regulations. Several standards are defined for control of hazardous energy, or lockout/tagout. In 1995 OSHA was successful in promulgation of regulations for utility.
In 1994 were established Electrical Safety Foundation International non-profit organization dedicated exclusively to promoting electrical safety at home and in the workplace.
 Standard 29 CFR 1910.269 - for electric power generation, transmission, and distribution, contained comprehensive regulations and addressed control of hazardous energy sources for power plant locations
Standards are compared with those of IEEE and National Fire Protection Association.

Lightning and earthing protection 
Lightning and Earthing protection systems are essential for the protection of humans, structures, protecting buildings from mechanical destruction caused by lightning effects and the associated risk of fire, Transmission lines, and electrical equipment from electric shock and Overcurrent.

Earthing protection systems  

TT system
TN system
IT system

Lightning protection systems  
lightning rod (simple rod or with triggering system)
lightning rod with taut wires.
lightning conductor with meshed cage (Faraday cage)

Physiological effects of electricity 
Electrical shocks on humans can lead to permanent disabilities or death. Size, frequency and duration of the electrical current affect the damage. The effects from electric shock can be: stopping the heart beating properly, preventing the person from breathing, causing muscle spasms. The skin features also affect the consequences of electric shock.

Indirect contact - can be avoided by automatic disconnection for TT system, automatic disconnection for TN systems, automatic disconnection on a second fault in an IT system, measures of protection against direct or indirect contact without automatic disconnection of supply
Direct contact - can be avoided by protection by the insulation of live parts, protection by means of barriers or enclosures, partial measures of protection, particular measures of protection

Electrical safety conductors 
  NEC 2008 Table 250.122 - Safeco Electric Supply

Electrical safety standards 
  Australian Standards - Australia - AS/NZS 3000:2007, AS/NZS 3012:2010, AS/NZS 3017:2007, AS/NZS 3760:2010, AS/NZS 4836:2011
  Български Държавен Стандарт - (On English:Bulgarian state standard) - БДС 12.2.096:1986 Bulgaria
  Brazilian National Regulation - NR10 Brazil
  - China GB4943, GB17625, GB9254
  IEEE/TÜV - Germany NSR Niederspannungsrichtlinie 2014/35/EU  
   La norme français C 15-100 - Aspects de la norme d’installation électrique France
 British standard - United Kingdom BS EN 61439, BS 5266, BS 5839, BS 6423, BS 6626, BS EN 62305, BS EN 60529 
 India Standardization - India - IS-5216, IS-5571, IS-6665
 Polska Norma - Poland - PN-EN 61010-2-201:2013-12E
  - ГОСТ 12.2.007.0-75,ГОСТ Р МЭК 61140-2000,ГОСТ 12.2.007.0-75,ГОСТ Р 52726-2007 Russia|
  NFPA, IEEE STD 80, IEEE STD 80 - United States
NFPA 496, NFPA 70

Lightning protection standards 
  NFPA 780, IEC 62305
  СТО 083-004-2010,ГОСТ Р МЭК 62561.2-2014
  БДС EN 62305-1:2011
  Norme NF C 15-100
  DIN EN 62305-1
  PN-EN 62305
  BS-EN 62305
  UNE 21186. Protección contra el rayo
  SNI 03-7015-2004
  IS 2309
  GB/T 36490-2018

Electronics and communications

Electronic products safety standards 
The manufacturers of electronic tools must take into account several standard for electronic safety to protect the health of humans and animals.
ANSI C95.3:1972  - Techniques & instrumentation for measurement of
potentially hazardous electromagnetic radiation at microwave frequencies.
  CNC-St2-44.01 V02.1.1 
 NOM-152
 MET MOC 023/96

Communication and high frequency safety standards 
Few standard were introduced for the harmful impact from high frequency, CB-02 Radio Equipment
ANSI/IEEE 1.2 mW/Cm for antennas 1800-2000 MHz range.
Radio Communication safety  ANSI/IEEE C95.1-1992, ГОСТ Р 50829-95
Mobile Communication safety 73/23/EEC and 91/263/EEC

See also 
Extra-low voltage
Electrical safety testing
Electrical Color Codes

Gallery

References 

Дулицкий Г. А., Комаревцев А. П. Электробезопасность при эксплуатации электроустановок напряжением до 1000 В. Справочник. — М.: Воениздат, 1988.
IEC 60050-195:1998. International Electrotechnical Vocabulary. Part 195: Earthing and protection against electric shock. Edition 1.0. – Geneva: IEC, 1998‑08.
Marinela Yordanova - Technical Safety, Bulgaria BDS standards,2010
M.M. Dawoud, A.S. Farag, J.M. Bakhashwain, and A. Frazi,"Study of EM Fields and
Radiated Power Generated from Dammam Radio Stations,"1998
N. Kuster, Q. Balzano, James C. Lin - Mobile Communications Safety, Springer Science & Business Media, 6 Dec 2012

Electrical engineering
Standards
Lists of standards